Ștefan Iancu (born 26 December 1997) is a Romanian actor. Born in Bucharest, Romania, Iancu began acting at the age of 4. He has remained active throughout much of his childhood and into adult life.

Education
Iancu is currently a student at the Caragiale Academy of Theatrical Arts and Cinematography.

Awards
He starred in the 2017 feature film One Step Behind the Seraphim, for which he won a Gopo Award.

He received the Best Newcomer award at the 2019 Subtitle Film Festival.

References

1997 births
Living people
Male actors from Bucharest
21st-century Romanian male actors
Romanian male film actors
Romanian male television actors